Feketelak is the Hungarian name for two villages in Romania:

 Lacu village, Geaca Commune, Cluj County
 Negrenii de Câmpie village, Band Commune, Mureș County